Rochus Tatamai (born September 24, 1962 in Raduna, Rabaul) is a Papua New Guinean clergyman and bishop for the Roman Catholic Diocese of Bereina. He was appointed bishop in 2007. He left to assume the same position in Rabaul in 2020.

References

1962 births
Papua New Guinean Roman Catholic bishops
Roman Catholic bishops of Bereina
Living people
People from East New Britain Province